David Usupashvili (Davit Usupašvili) (born March 5, 1968) is a Georgian lawyer and politician who was the chairman of the Parliament of Georgia from 2012 to 2016. He served as the chairman of the Republican Party of Georgia from June 27, 2005 to November 3, 2013. Nowadays, he is a chairman of the Political Council of Lelo for Georgia.

Career
Born in Magharo in Soviet Georgia, Usupashvili graduated from the Tbilisi State University with a degree in law in 1992 and obtained MA in International Development Policy from the Duke University in 1999. As a legal adviser with the State Council of Georgia, he was involved in drafting the Constitution of Georgia from 1993 to 1995. In 1994 he was among the founding members of the Georgian Young Lawyers' Association (GYLA), a non-governmental organization dedicated to promoting human rights and the rule of law, which he led as its first chairman from 1994 to 1997. He was active in the NGO-organized protests during the November 2003 Rose Revolution, which swept Mikheil Saakashvili to the presidency of Georgia. Usupashvili then distanced himself from the alliance with Saakashvili and withdrew into opposition, becoming, in June 2005, the chairman of the Republican Party of Georgia, a position he held until being succeeded by Khatuna Samnidze in November 2013.

In 2011, Usupashvili allied himself with the multi-billionaire businessman-turned-politician Bidzina Ivanishvili and became one of the leaders of Ivanishvili's Georgian Dream coalition, of which the Republican Party was a member. After the coalition's victory in the 2012 parliamentary election, Usupashvili was elected the chairman of the Parliament of Georgia on October 21, 2012. The Republican Party broke with the Georgian Dream and ran independently for the October 2016 parliamentary elections in which it failed to clear the required threshold. Shortly after the election, Usupashvili left the Republican Party, citing political and tactical disagreements. In June 2016, Usupashvili announced the creation of a new centrist political movement with the aim to contest the upcoming municipal election in October 2017.

Usupashvili is married to Tinatin Khidasheli, a fellow former Republican Party politician.

References

Speakers of the Parliament of Georgia
1968 births
Living people
Jurists from Georgia (country)
Lawyers from Georgia (country)
Tbilisi State University alumni
Academic staff of Tbilisi State University
People from Kakheti
21st-century politicians from Georgia (country)